Giotto was a European robotic spacecraft mission from the European Space Agency. The spacecraft flew by and studied Halley's Comet and in doing so became the first spacecraft to make close up observations of a comet. On 13 March 1986, the spacecraft succeeded in approaching Halley's nucleus at a distance of 596 kilometers. It was named after the Early Italian Renaissance painter Giotto di Bondone. He had observed Halley's Comet in 1301 and was inspired to depict it as the star of Bethlehem in his painting Adoration of the Magi in the Scrovegni Chapel.

Mission

Originally a United States partner probe was planned that would accompany Giotto, but this fell through due to budget cuts at NASA. There were plans to have observation equipment on board a Space Shuttle in low-Earth orbit around the time of Giottos fly-by, but they in turn fell through with the Challenger disaster.

The plan then became a cooperative armada of five space probes including Giotto, two from the Soviet Union's Vega program and two from Japan: the Sakigake and Suisei probes. The idea was for Japanese probes and the pre-existing American probe International Cometary Explorer to make long distance measurements, followed by the Russian Vegas which would locate the nucleus, and the resulting information sent back would allow Giotto to precisely target very close to the nucleus. Because Giotto would pass so very close to the nucleus ESA was mostly convinced it would not survive the encounter due to the spacecraft colliding at very high speed with the many dust particles from the comet. The coordinated group of probes became known as the Halley Armada.

Design

The cylindrical spacecraft was 1.85 m in diameter and had three internal platforms. It was derived from the GEOS research satellite built by British Aerospace in Filton, Bristol, and modified with the addition of a dust shield (Whipple shield) as proposed by Fred Whipple. The shield comprised a thin (1 mm) aluminium sheet separated by a space and a thicker (12 mm) Kevlar sheet. The later Stardust spacecraft would use a similar Whipple shield. Giotto also had a 1.51 m diameter antenna that it used to communicate with Earth. A mock-up of the spacecraft resides at the Bristol Aero Collection hangar, at Filton, Bristol, England, United Kingdom, Europe.

Science Instruments 
Giotto had 10 science instruments.

 MAG: a magnetometer 
 HMC (Halley Multicolour Camera): a 16-cm telescope and camera
 DID (Dust Impactor Detector System): measured the mass of dust particles that hit the instrument
 RPA (Rème Plasma Analyser): studied solar wind and charged particles
 JPA (Johnstone Plasma Analyser): also measured solar wind and charged particles
 PIA (Particulate Impact Analyser): studied the size and chemistry of particles
 OPE (Optical Probe Experiment): examined the emissivity of gas and dust behind the spacecraft
 EPA (Energetic Particle Analyser): analyzed alpha-particles, electrons, and neutrons
 NMS (Neutral Mass Spectrometer): measured the composition of the particles around the comet
 IMS (Ion Mass Spectrometer): measured the amount of ions from the sun and the comet
 GRE (Giotto Radio Experiment): used Giotto's radio signals to study Halley's comet

Timeline

Launch

The mission was given the go-ahead by ESA in 1980, and launched
on an Ariane 1 rocket (flight V14) on 2 July 1985 from Kourou, French Guiana. The craft was controlled from the European Space Agency ESOC facilities in Darmstadt (then West Germany) initially in Geostationary Transfer Orbit (GTO) then in the Near Earth Phase (NEP) before the longer Cruise Phase through to the encounter. While in GTO a number of slew and spin-up manoeuvres (to 90 RPM) were carried out in preparation for the firing of the Apogee Boost Motor (ABM), although unlike orbit circularisations for geostationary orbit, the ABM for Giotto was fired at perigee. Attitude determination and control used sun pulse and IR Earth sensor data in the telemetry to determine the spacecraft orientation.

Halley encounter

The Soviet Vega 1 started returning images of Halley on 4 March 1986, and the first ever of its nucleus, and made its flyby on 6 March, followed by Vega 2 making its flyby on 9 March. Vega 1's closest approach to Halley was
8 889 km.

Giotto passed Halley successfully on 14 March 1986 at 596 km distance, and surprisingly survived despite being hit by some small particles. One impact sent it spinning off its stabilized spin axis so that its antenna no longer always pointed at the Earth, and its dust shield no longer protected its instruments. After 32 minutes Giotto re-stabilized itself and continued gathering science data.

Another impact destroyed the Halley Multicolor Camera, but not before it took photographs of the nucleus at closest approach.

First Earth flyby

Giottos trajectory was adjusted for an Earth flyby and its science instruments were turned off on 15 March 1986 at 02:00 UTC.

Grigg-Skjellerup encounter

Giotto was commanded to wake up on 2 July 1990 when it flew by Earth in order to sling shot to its next cometary encounter.

The probe then flew by the Comet Grigg-Skjellerup on 10 July 1992 which it approached to a distance of about 200 km. Afterwards, Giotto was again switched off on 23 July 1992.

Second Earth flyby

In 1999 Giotto made another Earth flyby but was not reactivated.

Scientific results

Images showed Halley's nucleus to be a dark peanut-shaped body, 15 km long, 7 km to 10 km wide. Only 10% of the surface was active, with at least three outgassing jets seen on the sunlit side. Analysis showed the comet formed 4.5 billion years ago from volatiles (mainly ice) that had condensed onto interstellar dust particles. It had remained practically unaltered since its formation.

Measured volume of material ejected by Halley:

 80% water,
 10% carbon monoxide
 2.5% a mix of methane and ammonia.
 other hydrocarbons, iron, and sodium were detected in trace amounts.

Giotto found Halley's nucleus was dark, which suggested a thick covering of dust.

The nucleus's surface was rough and of a porous quality, with the density of the whole nucleus as low as 0.3 g/cm3. Sagdeev's team estimated a density of
0.6 g/cm3, but S. J. Peale warned that all estimates had error bars too large to be informative.

The quantity of material ejected was found to be three tonnes per second for seven jets, and these caused the comet to wobble over long time periods.

The dust ejected was mostly only the size of cigarette smoke particles, with masses ranging from 10 ag to 0.4 g. (See Orders of magnitude (mass).) The mass of the particle that impacted Giotto and sent it spinning was not measured, but from its effects—it also probably broke off a piece of Giotto—the mass has been estimated to lie between 0.1 g and 1 g.

Two kinds of dust were seen: one with carbon, hydrogen, nitrogen and oxygen; the other with calcium, iron, magnesium, silicon and sodium.

The ratio of abundances of the comet's light elements excluding nitrogen (i.e. hydrogen, carbon, oxygen) were the same as the Sun's. The implication is that the constituents of Halley are among the most primitive in the Solar System.

The plasma and ion mass spectrometer instruments showed Halley has a carbon-rich surface.

Spacecraft achievements

 Giotto made the closest approach to Halley's Comet and provided the best data for this comet.
 Giotto was the first spacecraft to provide detailed pictures of a cometary nucleus.
 Giotto was the first spacecraft to make a close flyby of two comets. Young and active comet Halley could be compared to old comet 26P/Grigg–Skjellerup.
 Giotto was the first spacecraft to return from interplanetary space and perform an Earth swing-by.
 Giotto was the first spacecraft to be re-activated from hibernation mode.
 Giotto was the first spacecraft to use Earth for a gravity assist.

See also

 Timeline of Solar System exploration

Notes

External links

 Mission website
 Interview with the mission's Deputy Project Scientist by NASA's Solar System Exploration
 Nature 1986 about Giotto mission
 Giotto di Bondone's Adoration of the Magi painting that includes his rendition of Halley's Comet
 Image of Halley in 1986 by Giotto spacecraft
 Giotto Mission Archive at the NASA Planetary Data System, Small Bodies Node
 Giotto Extended Mission Archive at the NASA Planetary Data System, Small Bodies Node

Giotto di Bondone
European Space Agency space probes
Missions to comets
Satellites orbiting the Sun
1985 in spaceflight
Derelict space probes
Missions to Halley's Comet
Spacecraft launched in 1985